CNN is the Cable News Network, a television network based in Atlanta, Georgia, US.

CNN or cnn may also refer to:

Arts, media and entertainment

Television
 HLN (TV network), a spinoff of CNN, formerly known as CNN2 and CNN Headline News
 CNN International, a US-based television network broadcast worldwide
 CNN en Español, a Spanish-language version of CNN, based in Atlanta, Georgia
 CNN Chile, a Chilean-based version of CNN
 CNN Airport, a former CNN specialty channel for air travelers
 CNN+, a defunct news streaming service
 CNN+ (Spanish TV network), a former Spain-based version of CNN
 CNN-News18, an India-based news channel
 CNN Türk, a Turkish-based version of CNN
 CNN Indonesia, an Indonesian-based version of CNN
 CNN Arabic, an Arabic-language version of CNN, based in Atlanta, Georgia
 CNNj, a Japanese-language version of CNN, based in Atlanta, Georgia
 CNN Philippines, a Philippine-based version of CNN
 CNN Portugal, a Portuguese-based version of CNN
 CNN Brazil, a Brazilian-based version of CNN

Other arts, media and entertainment
 CNN Interactive (CNN.com), the CNN website
 WCNN, a sports-talk radio station in Atlanta, Georgia, US
 Capone-N-Noreaga (C-N-N), a hip hop duo
 CNN, later XC-NN, a band formed by All About Eve's Tim Bricheno
 "CNN", a song by Baboon from the 1991 album Ed Lobster
 "CNN", a song by Zebda from the 1992 album L'arène des rumeurs

Science and technology
 Cellular neural network, a parallel computing paradigm
 Convolutional neural network, a multilayer perceptron variation
 Condoms, needles, and negotiation, an approach to reducing sexually transmitted diseases
 Centrosomin, a protein in Drosophila melanogaster

Other uses
 Canonbury railway station (National Rail station code), England
 Kannur International Airport (IATA code)
 Phổ Thông Chuyên Ngoại Ngữ (Foreign Languages Specializing School), Vietnam